Elaphriella dikhonikhe is a species of sea snail, a marine gastropod mollusk, in the family Solariellidae.

Distribution
This species occurs in Solomon Islands.

References

Solariellidae